John W. Becker (February 10, 1903 – September 17, 1947) was an American football player. He played college football at Dayton and Denison and professional football in the National Football League (NFL) as a tackle, guard and back for the Dayton Triangles. He appeared in 19 NFL games, 13 as a starter, during the 1926, 1927, 1928, and 1929 seasons.

References

1903 births
1947 deaths
Dayton Flyers football players
Dayton Triangles players
Players of American football from Ohio
People from Dayton, Ohio